Chayka transmitter Slonim is the 2nd secondary station of the Western Russian Chain RSDN-3 (GRI 8000) with a transmission power of 450 kW. 

See also
 LORAN

Towers in Belarus